During the 2004–05 English football season, Blackburn Rovers competed in the FA Premier League.

Season summary
The authoritative methods of manager Graeme Souness had caused Blackburn to struggle the previous season and alienated several key players, including the strike partnership of Andy Cole and Dwight Yorke, who left Blackburn during the summer for Fulham and Birmingham City respectively. Eventually Souness departed Blackburn to become manager at Newcastle United, with Blackburn struggling in the relegation zone. Wales manager and former Rovers player Mark Hughes came in as his replacement; Hughes' lack of experience in club management showed and the club were bottom of the Premiership after 14 games played, but he soon rallied the team to finish comfortably clear of relegation in 15th – as close to a relegation spot as they were to a UEFA Cup place, in terms of points. The club also enjoyed a good run in the FA Cup, reaching the semi-finals before losing to eventual cup winners Arsenal.

During the close season, Hughes signed striker Craig Bellamy, who had played for Hughes with Wales, from Newcastle, in the hope that the Tyneside club's out-of-favour striker could fire Rovers to a higher place next season.

Final league table

Players

First-team squad
Squad at end of season

Left club during season

Reserve squad

Statistics

Appearances and goals

|-
! colspan=14 style=background:#dcdcdc; text-align:center| Goalkeepers

|-
! colspan=14 style=background:#dcdcdc; text-align:center| Defenders

|-
! colspan=14 style=background:#dcdcdc; text-align:center| Midfielders

|-
! colspan=14 style=background:#dcdcdc; text-align:center| Forwards

|-
! colspan=14 style=background:#dcdcdc; text-align:center| Players transferred out during the season

Results

Premier League

Results by matchday

League Cup

FA Cup

Notes

References

Blackburn Rovers F.C. seasons
Black